Ivan Mršić (born August 1, 1949), also known as John Mrsic and Big J, is a Yugoslav retired footballer.

Born in Teslić, SR Bosnia and Herzegovina, Yugoslavia, he began his career in 1963, with local club FK Proleter Teslić. He was picked up by bigger club FK Borac Banja Luka the next season.  He turned down an offer from Croatian Giants HNK Hajduk Split and went on to play with many Yugoslav clubs including three first division clubs NK Olimpija Ljubljana, FK Radnički Kragujevac, and Yugoslav power house FK Partizan although only playing two matches, both friendly. He finished his European career playing with FK Spartak Subotica and FK Pelister in the Yugoslav Second League before coming and playing professional in the United States for Fort Lauderdale Strikers in 1978.  After a season he went on to play for ASL's Columbus Magic He also played in the National Soccer League in the summer of 1976 with the Serbian White Eagles and Windsor Stars. In 1981, Mršić signed with the Cleveland Force of the Major Indoor Soccer League.  He then moved to Canada where he  finished his career with Toronto Croatia.

His son, Simon Mrsic, born 1991, is also a footballer, and has played with San Jose Earthquakes reserve team and of NK Osijek, FK Rudar Prijedor and OFK Bačka.

References

External links
 

1949 births
Living people
People from Teslić
Yugoslav footballers
Yugoslav expatriate footballers
Bosnia and Herzegovina footballers
FK Borac Banja Luka players
NK Olimpija Ljubljana (1945–2005) players
FK Partizan players
FK Radnički 1923 players
NK Jedinstvo Bihać players
FK Spartak Subotica players
FK Pelister players
American Soccer League (1933–1983) players
Cleveland Force (original MISL) players
Columbus Magic players
Fort Lauderdale Strikers (1977–1983) players
Major Indoor Soccer League (1978–1992) players
North American Soccer League (1968–1984) players
Serbian White Eagles FC players
Toronto Croatia players
Association football forwards
Expatriate soccer players in Canada
Expatriate soccer players in the United States
Yugoslav expatriate sportspeople in Canada
Yugoslav expatriate sportspeople in the United States
Canadian National Soccer League players